Combined marriage is a form of polyandry that existed in the pre-Islamic period in the Arabian peninsula.

Definition
This form of marriage, according to a Hadith narration attributed to Aisha:

This form of marriage was outlawed by Islam, which requires that any man and woman be married prior to sexual intercourse. In addition, Islam requires that the identity of the father be known, in turn prohibiting a woman from having sexual intercourse with more than one man, her husband. See Islamic marital jurisprudence for more information.

See also
Polyandry
Pre-Islamic Arabia

References

Polyandry